That's Funny! is a syndicated TV show created by Vin Di Bona, the creator of America's Funniest Home Videos and America's Funniest People. It is hosted by Rondell Sheridan. It solely features replays of old America's Funniest People clips, as well as a studio audience.  The show is generally aired in late nights and as filler programming.

First-run syndicated television programs in the United States